Gareth Williams (born 13 July 1984) is a New Zealand born actor of television, film and theatre. He trained for a year with the Auckland Theatre Company at the prestigious Globe Theater in London. He then attained his Bachelor of Performing Arts at Toi Whakaari: New Zealand Drama School in 2006. Williams has since had television roles in Facelift (2007), This Is Not My Life (2009), Legend of the Seeker (2010), as well as some minor feature film roles.

He has gained recognition through musical theatre, receiving positive reviews for his role as William Kemmler in the Indian Ink production of The Dentist's Chair. Shannon Huse, reviewer for the New Zealand Herald, wrote "Gareth Williams is suitably cadaver scary as William Kemmler, the ghost of the first man to be executed by electric chair who haunts Albert. He gives a charismatic performance that includes two ghoulish songs."

He has also taken on such stage roles as Benvolio in Romeo and Juliet (2010) and 'The Balladeer' in 'Assassins' (2010).

Williams landed the supporting role of Vettius in Spartacus: Gods of the Arena (2011).

Filmography

Film

Television

Awards
2010 – Best Comedy Show – Winner – Wellington Fringe Festival – The Lonesome Buckwhips

2010 – Billy T James Award – Nominee – The Lonesome Buckwhips

2009 – Best Newcomer – Winner – Metro Magazine

References

External links
 
 Profile from Johnson & Laird, his manager

1984 births
Living people
New Zealand male film actors
New Zealand male television actors
New Zealand male stage actors
Toi Whakaari alumni

pt:Gareth Williams